Seo Yoo-hyeng (born May 25, 1965) is a Zainichi Korean member of , an (impersonated-)uyoku organization, and the Mie Prefecture-based Hane-gumi branch of Yamaguchi-gumi, a yakuza organization. Jo assassinated Hideo Murai, a member of Aum Shinrikyo, on April 23, 1995.

Charges that Kenji Kamimine (上峯 憲司), a former leader of Hane-gumi, ordered Jo to kill Murai were dismissed by the Tokyo High Court.

Jo was sentenced to 12 years in prison for the murder.

Notes 

1965 births
Living people
Zainichi Korean people
Murder in Japan
Korean people convicted of murder
Yakuza members
Yamaguchi-gumi
Japanese people convicted of murder
1995 murders in Japan
People convicted of murder by Japan